DRT Entertainment was a New York City based independent record label founded in 2003 by Derek Shulman, Ron Urban, and Theodore "Ted" Green. The label is defunct.

The label advertised itself as an "artist friendly hard rock music company for bands with a touring fan base." The company was distributed by Universal Music Group's Fontana Distribution. DRT was also distributed by Universal Music Canada and a variety of companies in the rest of the world including Soulfood in Germany, Shock Records in Australia and JVC Records in Japan.

DRT had one subsidiary label, Brass Tacks Records. It was a vanity label founded by the Street Dogs.

In 2005, it released Alucard Music's "35th Anniversary" editions of many CDs by Gentle Giant, Shulman's former band. (Thirty-five years after the debut album.)

The label closed in 2009.

Roster
 36 Crazyfists
 American Head Charge
 Aphasia
 Artimus Pyledriver
 Blindside
 Clutch
 Fu Manchu
 Gwar
 John Wesley Harding
 Lit
 Lynam
 Edwin McCain
 Powerman 5000
 The Rasmus
 Rikets
 Seven Mary Three
 SOiL
 U.P.O.

See also 
 List of record labels

References

American independent record labels
Record labels established in 2003
Record labels disestablished in 2009
Rock record labels
Defunct companies based in New York City
2003 establishments in New York City
2009 disestablishments in New York (state)
Defunct record labels of the United States
American companies established in 2003